Bhaangarh is a 2014 horror film directed by Dilip Sood and co-produced by Mayank Jain and Ajay Rai. The film is based on Bhangarh Fort, Rajasthan which is known as the most haunted place in Asia.

Plot outline
A group of friends six friends visit Bhangarh Fort. While visiting the Fort, they accidentally enter and get trapped in the strictly prohibited and actually haunted area of the Fort.

Cast
Adeel Chaudhry as Shakti
Suzanna Mukherjee as Rahi
Tom Alter
Puneet as Deepak
Aneet Kaur Sekhon as Jaz
Debonita Sur as Pia
Herry Tangiri as Goldie

Production and release
Film was directed and written by Dilip Sood. In an interview he said, "Since childhood I have been a huge horror fan with a special interest in slasher and psychological horror films. Through Bhaangarh, I have tried to deviate from the traditional Indian horror film and give audiences a new experience which draws from both these subgenres. The film will surely take audience by surprise, keeping them guessing and scaring them at the same time. The movie deals with human emotion and how, when your worst nightmare comes true, it becomes impossible to tell between a friend from a foe. We have tried to capture this essence and communicate it to audience through the movie's trailer and poster."

The film was Bollywood debut of Adeel Chaudhry. The trailer of the film was released on 7 June 2014 and the film was released on 5 September 2014 in India.

Soundtrack
The soundtrack of Bhaangarh was directed by Adeel Chaudhry and Aniket Kar.

See also
Bhangarh Fort
List of Bollywood Films

References

External links

2014 horror films
2010s Hindi-language films